Sigma Coronae Borealis (σ CrB) is a star system in the constellation of Corona Borealis. It is a quintuple star system containing three sunlike main-sequence stars and two other low-mass stars. The combined visual magnitude is 5.3 and the system lies 74 light years from Earth. σ CrB A is the variable star TZ Coronae Borealis.

System components
The brightest components of Sigma Coronae Borealis form a visual binary with an angular separation of 7 arcsecond first resolved in the 19th century, and are designated σ Corona Borealis A and B. More recently, the designations σ2 and σ1 Corona Borealis have come into use. Somewhat confusingly, the brighter component A is referred to as σ2 because it has the higher right ascension. It is known in the Washington Double Star Catalog (WDS), a compilation of observations of double stars, as component E, but it is usually called Sigma Coronae Borealis C.

Sigma1 Corona Borealis is a G-type main-sequence star like the Sun, and has similar parameters: a mass roughly equal to that of the Sun, and an effective temperature of 5950 K. A visual orbit has been calculated, with a period of about 730 years and a high eccentricity of 0.72.

Sigma2 Corona Borealis itself is a close binary. Here, the two stars are extremely close and orbit fairly quickly, every 1.14 days. This tiny separation of only 0.0279 au has allowed the two stars to exert tidal forces on each other, leading to synchronization of their rotation. They have also been classified as RS Canum Venaticorum variables (RS CVn)—young, active stars that show variability in their apparent magnitude due to starspots on their surfaces.

Despite Sigma2 Corona Borealis's two stars being separated only by about the diameter of each star, they were resolved using the CHARA optical interferometer at the Mount Wilson Observatory. As of 2006, it is the shortest-period binary ever to be resolved. The primary is 13.7% more massive than the Sun, while the secondary is 9.0% more massive than the Sun, and both are 24.4% wider than the Sun.

σ Coronae Borealis C, also known as HIP 79551, appears as a red dwarf with a spectral type of M2.5V. It too is a binary star, with a companion in a 52-year orbit.

Optical companions
The Washington Double Star Catalog (WDS), a compilation of observations of double stars, lists several components to the main system. Two of those are listed in the WDS as components C, and D. As of 1984, component C was separated from the primary by  along a position angle of 103° and as of 1996, component D was separated from the primary by  along a position angle of 82°. However, both of them have different proper motions through space and are not related, just optical alignments.

Variability
The spectroscopic binary σ2 CrB is an RS Canum Venaticorum variable. It varies in brightness by 0.05 magnitudes every 1.139789 days, the same as the orbital period. The brightness changes are caused by variations in surface brightness on the stars, effectively giant sunspots. Variable star designations are not given to stars with Bayer designations, but in this case only one component of σ Coronae Borealis is identified as variable, so it has the designation TZ Coronae Borealis.

See also
Xi Ursae Majoris, another quintuple containing an RS CVn binary

References

External links

Corona Borealis
146361
Coronae Borealis, Sigma
Coronae Borealis, TZ
Coronae Borealis, 17
6063
F-type main-sequence stars
G-type main-sequence stars
079607
5
RS Canum Venaticorum variables
Durchmusterung objects
9550
M-type main-sequence stars